USS Zumwalt (DDG-1000) is a guided missile destroyer of the United States Navy. Zumwalt has stealth capabilities, having a radar cross-section similar to a fishing boat despite her large size. On 7 December 2015, Zumwalt began her sea trial preparatory to joining the Pacific Fleet. The ship was commissioned in Baltimore on 15 October 2016. Her home port is San Diego, California.

Namesake

Zumwalt is named after Elmo Russell Zumwalt Jr., who was an American naval officer and the youngest man to serve as the Chief of Naval Operations. As an admiral and later the 19th Chief of Naval Operations, Zumwalt played a major role in U.S. military history, especially during the Vietnam War. A highly decorated war veteran, Zumwalt reformed the US Navy's personnel policies in an effort to improve enlisted life and ease racial tensions. After he retired from a 32-year naval career, he launched an unsuccessful campaign for the United States Senate.

Role
The Zumwalt class was designed with multimission capability. Unlike previous destroyer classes, designed primarily for deep-water combat, the Zumwalt class was primarily designed to support ground forces in land attacks, in addition to the usual destroyer missions of anti-air, anti-surface, and antisubmarine warfare.

Zumwalt is equipped with two Advanced Gun Systems (AGS), which are designed to fire the Long Range Land Attack Projectile (LRLAP). LRLAP was to be one of a range of land attack and ballistic projectiles for the AGS, but was the only munition the AGS could use. LRLAP had a range of up to  fired from the AGS. It was to be a key component for ground forces support, but LRLAP procurement was cancelled in 2016 and the Navy has no plan to replace it. Since Zumwalt class cannot provide naval gunfire support the Navy has re-purposed the class to surface warfare.

History

Construction 
Many of the ship's features were originally developed under the DD21 program ("21st Century Destroyer"). In 2001, Congress cut the DD-21 program by half as part of the SC21 program. To save it, the acquisition program was renamed as DD(X) and heavily reworked. The initial funding allocation for DDG-1000 was included in the National Defense Authorization Act of 2007. By February 2008, a $1.4 billion contract had been awarded to Bath Iron Works in Bath, Maine, and full rate production officially began a year later, on 11 February 2009.

In July 2008, a construction timetable was set for General Dynamics to deliver the ship in April 2013, with a March 2015 target date for Zumwalt to meet her initial operating capability but, by 2012 the planned completion and delivery of the vessel was delayed to the 2014 fiscal year. The first section of the ship was laid down on the slipway at Bath Iron Works on 17 November 2011, by which point, fabrication of the ship was over 60% complete. The naming ceremony was planned for 19 October 2013, but was canceled due to the United States federal government shutdown of 2013. The vessel was launched on 29 October 2013.

Sea trials 
In January 2014, Zumwalt began to prepare for heavy weather trials, to see how the ship and her instrumentation react to high winds, stormy seas, and adverse weather conditions. The ship's new wave-piercing inverted bow and tumblehome hull configuration reduced her radar cross-section. Tests involved lateral and vertical accelerations and pitch and roll. Later tests included fuel on-loading, data center tests, propulsion events, X-band radar evaluations, and mission systems activation to finalize integration of electronics. These all culminated in builders' trials and acceptance trials, with delivery for US Navy tests in late 2014, and with initial operating capability (IOC) to be reached by 2016.

Zumwalts first commanding officer was Captain James A. Kirk. Kirk attracted some media attention when he was first named the captain, due to the similarity of his name to that of the Star Trek television character Captain James T. Kirk, played by William Shatner. Shatner wrote a letter of support to Zumwalts crew in April 2014. On 7 December 2015, the ship departed Bath Iron Works for sea trials to allow the Navy and contractors to operate the vessel under rigorous conditions to determine whether Zumwalt is ready to join the fleet as an actively commissioned warship.

On 12 December 2015, during sea trials, Zumwalt responded to a US Coast Guard call for assistance for a fishing boat captain who was experiencing a medical emergency  from Portland, Maine. Due to deck conditions, the Coast Guard helicopter was unable to hoist the patient from the fishing boat, so Zumwalts crew used their 11-meter rigid-hulled inflatable boat (RHIB) to transfer him to the destroyer, from which he was transported to shore by the Coast Guard helicopter and then to a hospital. The US Navy accepted delivery of Zumwalt on 20 May 2016. In September 2016, it was reported that the vessel needed repairs after the detection of a seawater leak in the ship's auxiliary motor drive oil system. The US Navy commissioned Zumwalt on 15 October 2016, in Baltimore during Fleet Week.

Post-commissioning 

On 21 November 2016, Zumwalt lost propulsion in her port shaft while passing through the Panama Canal from the Atlantic to the Pacific Ocean en route to her homeport in San Diego. Water had intruded in two of the four bearings that connect Zumwalts port and starboard Advanced Induction Motors to the drive shafts. Both drive shafts failed and Zumwalt struck the lock walls in the canal, causing minor cosmetic damage. Zumwalts passage through the Panama Canal had to be completed with tugboats.  Zumwalt underwent repairs at Vasco Núñez de Balboa Naval Base near the Pacific end of the canal before continuing on to Naval Station San Diego. Upon the ship's arrival in San Diego, the leak was revealed to be through the lubrication cooling system, though the cause remains unknown. Sources close to the incident described the completion of the canal transit with tugboats a prudent measure, and lauded Captain Kirk for quick thinking and integrity to acknowledge the cooling system failure rather than risk damage to the propulsion system by steering the ship to the dock without assistance.

Post-delivery 

In April 2019, Zumwalt departed San Diego for a first operational deployment into the Pacific since the shipyard availability conducted in 2017 and 2018. This patrol included a visit to Ketchikan, Alaska, during which Zumwalt'''s  watch teams were able to conduct stability trials in stormy seas (Sea State 6), and Pearl Harbor, marking the first visit of a Zumwalt Class Destroyer to Hawaii. The Navy accepted delivery in April 2020, preparing for more sea tests.

In September 2022 Zumwalt made her first port call in Guam during the longest voyage since the ship was commissioned.

 References 

 External links 

 
 Christening of Lead Ship Zumwalt (DDG 1000)—Official General Dynamics website
 DDG-1000 Zumwalt / DD(X) Multi-Mission Surface Combatant—GlobalSecurity.org site covering the Zumwalt'' class
 USS Zumwalt underway

2013 ships
Zumwalt-class destroyers
Ships built in Bath, Maine